Martha & Snoop's Potluck Dinner Party is an American variety show starring Martha Stewart and Snoop Dogg. The series premiered on VH1 on November 7, 2016.

It is filmed at CBS Studio Center in the Studio City district of Los Angeles, California.

Episodes

Season 1 (2016–2017)

Season 2 (2017–2018)

Season 3: Potluck Party Challenge (2019–20)

For this season, the show slightly changes into a competition format as Martha and Snoop along with their respective celebrity team members compete for the "Potluck Party Platter" with celebrity judge(s) choosing the winning team.
Note: The winning team are listed in bold

References

External links
 

2010s American variety television series
2016 American television series debuts
2020 American television series endings
VH1 original programming